This is a list of Emirati football transfers for the 2016 summer transfer window by club. Only transfers of clubs in the Arabian Gulf League are included.

Players without a club may join one at any time, either during or in between transfer windows.

Arabian Gulf League

Al Ahli

In:

Out:

Al Ain

In:

Out:

Al Dhafra

In:

Out:

Al Jazira

In:

Out:

Al Nasr

In:

Out:

Al Shabab

In:

Out:

Al Wahda

In:

Out:

Al Wasl

In:

Out:

Baniyas

In:

Out:

Dibba

In:

Out:

Emirates

In:

Out:

Hatta

In:

Out:

Kalba

In:

Out:

Sharjah

In:

Out:

References

2016 in Emirati sport
Football in the United Arab Emirates
Emirati